Olinalá  is one of the 81 municipalities of Guerrero, in south-western Mexico. The municipal seat lies at Olinalá. The municipality covers an area of 1,028.1 km2.

As of 2005, the municipality had a total population of 22,645.

References

Municipalities of Guerrero